A round of drinks is a set of alcoholic beverages purchased by one person in a group for that complete group. The purchaser buys the round of drinks as a single order at the bar. In many places it is customary for people to take turns buying rounds.

It is a nearly ubiquitous custom in Ireland, the United Kingdom, Canada, New Zealand, and Australia.  In Australia and New Zealand it is referred to as shouting.  This practice is also customary in many parts of North America, especially in areas where people with cultural roots in Ireland and the UK predominate.
A notable exception was the UK State Management Scheme in which treating (i.e. buying a round) was forbidden, from July 1916 until June 1919.

Greaves' Rules
Greaves' Rules is a set of etiquette guidelines common in the UK for buying rounds of drinks in English public houses. The rules were first defined by William Greaves (April 1938 - November 2017), a London journalist of the defunct Today newspaper as a Saturday morning essay in the paper, based upon his long experience of pubs and rounds. They immediately attracted a wide following in drinking circles and are known internationally as a representation of the spirit of drinking in an English pub.

When an individual arrives at a pub, common practice invites the newcomer to unilaterally offer a drink to a companion, with the unspoken understanding that when the drink has been nearly consumed, his/her companion will reciprocate. Trust and fair play are the root of the rules, though there are occasions (such as a requirement of one of the drinkers to need to carry out more important jobs, if any can be conceived of) where the rules can be broken, and were itemised by Greaves in his article. See, for example a copy of Greaves' Rules in the Oxford Pub Guide, with particular reference to rule 7 and especially rule 8.

Greaves' Rules is a lighthearted set of rules governing whose turn it is to buy a round of drinks in a British public house. The rules were first published as a Saturday essay in the now defunct Today newspaper but were later re-commissioned by the Daily Telegraph and published in that newspaper on 20 November 1993. Copies of the rules soon appeared  in many bars throughout the UK and are now known internationally as a representation of the spirit of drinking in a British pub.

Kate Fox, a social anthropologist came up with a similar idea in her book Watching the English, but concluded their rationale was the need to minimise the possibility of violence between drinking companions.

Australia
In John O'Grady's They're a Weird Mob, Nino learns some customs related to shouting.
<blockquote>
Your turn.What is my turn?Your turn to shoutWhy should I shout?Because I shouted you.I did not hear you shout at me.He thought for a while and said, I get it. When you buy a bloke a beer, it's called a shout, see?Why is that?I haven't a clue, but that's what it's called. I shouted for you, now it's your turn to shout for me.I was only a little thirsty. I do not think I wish another drink.He looked quite stern, In this country, if you want to keep out of trouble, you always return a shout, see?Is this the custom?Bloody oath, it's the custom. Your turn.
</blockquote>

United States
In the culture of the United States Military, possession of a challenge coin can be used to determine who buys a round of drinks. One individual of a group lays down their coin, and all else present must lay down their coins as well. Anyone who does not have a coin with them must buy a round. If everyone can produce a coin, the challenger must buy a round.

References

Further reading
 Gutfeld, Greg. Lessons from the Land of Pork Scratchings'', London: Simon and Schuster, 2008. 

Etiquette
Drinking culture